USS PGM-8 was a PGM-1 class motor gunboat that served in the United States Navy during World War II.  She was originally laid down as a SC-497 class submarine chaser on 2 November 1942 by the Wilmington Boat Works in Wilmington, California and launched on 1 May 1943.  She was commissioned as USS SC-1366 on 12 August 1943.  She was later converted to a PGM-1 class motor gunboat and renamed PGM-8 on 10 December 1943.  After the war she was transferred to the Foreign Liquidations Commission in May 1947.  Her exact fate is unknown.

En Route to the Treasury Islands in the South Pacific

January 23, 1944 at 1200 hours, USS PGM-8 departed San Pedro, California, headed for Pearl Harbor, Territory of Hawaii, in company of PGM’s 1, 2, 3, 4, 5, 6 and 7, and USS Armadillo (IX-111). The Armadillo provided fuel and water for the PGM’s on the way to Hawaii.  These small ships traversed the Pacific Ocean under their own power, en route to their duty station in the Solomon Islands. Along the way, five of the PGMs dropped out of the lead convoy for various reasons.

PGM-8’s log indicates that the convoy was underway for Pearl Harbor in obedience to Commander Task Group 14.2 movement order #13-44 of 22 January 1944 as task unit 14.2.5, PGM-8 OTC (officer in tactical command).  Just hours after leaving San Pedro, the convoy was in heavy seas.  The deck log of USS PGM-2 contains the following entries for January 23, 1944: 1800  wind force 5, sea rough  2100 wind increased to force 7  sea extremely rough.  On January 25 the PGM-8 log contains this entry: "1120 USS PGM-2 reported taking water through seams in forward compartment, and that water was coming in faster than pumps could handle it, and requested permission to return to San Pedro, California, with another ship to stand by.  1130 on orders from this vessel, USS PGM-2 and USS PGM-4 left formation and set course to return to San Pedro.”  The remaining ships of the convoy continued on to Hawaii. February 1, 1254 hours, PGM-8 moored port side to USS PC 586 at Berth S-19, Pearl Harbor.

PGM-8 log contains the following entries for February 12, 1944: "1115 underway for Tutuila, Samoa, pursuant to orders of Commander Task Force 16 Operational order 40-44, Airmailgram 112330 of February 1044.  Designated task unit 16.16.8. In company with USS PGM's 1, 3, 5, 7.  This vessel C.T.U.  1209 took departure."  At the time of departure, USS PGM-6 was in dry dock at Pearl Harbor.  It remained behind waiting for PGM’s 2 and 4 to arrive from San Pedro, after repairs to the hull of PGM-2.

PGM-8 arrived at Palmyra Island on February 15, mooring at the fuel dock in the harbor at 1125 hours.  The ship took on 3561 gallons of fuel and departed on February 16 for Tutuila, Samoa in company with PGM's 1, 3, 5 and 7.  February 20, PGM-8 moored to Base Office Dock, Pago Pago Harbor, Tutuila, Samoa.  While in Pago Pago harbor, the ship took on 3975 gallons of fuel.  On February 24 at 1040 hours the ship departed Tutuila,  underway for Suva, Fiji Islands, pursuant to orders of Port Director, Tutuila, Samoa serial no. 648.  Designated task unit 16.16.8, in company with USS PGM’s 1, 3, 5, 7.,  PGM-8 was designated C.T.U.

On February 26 the ship crossed the 180 degree meridian at 1229 hours and the ship’s log date was forwarded to February 27.  On this day, at 1934 hours, PGM-8 moored port side to King’s wharf, Suva Harbor, Fiji Islands.  The next day the ship was underway at 1715 hours for Nouméa, New Caledonia, pursuant to orders of Port Director, Suva, Fiji dated 25 February 1944.  The ship was in company with USS PGM’s 3, 5, 7.  Designated as task unit 16.16.8,  PGM-8 was C.T.U.  USS PGM-1 remained at Suva and continued on to Nouméa on March 5.

At 1510 hours on March 2, PGM-8 moored to a buoy in Fisherman’s Bay, Nouméa, New Caledonia. Nineteen members of the crew were sent ashore on March 8 for 3 days of anti-aircraft training.  While at Nouméa, the ship took on 3600 gallons of fuel.  At 1418 hours on March 12, the ship was underway for Espiritu Santo, New Hebrides pursuant to orders of Com 3rd Fleet, dated 11 March 1944 (Dispatch 110103).  In company with USS PGM’s 3, 5, 7, PGM-8 was OTC.  March 14, 0926 hours, the ship moored port side to USS SC 727, berth 1, Espiritu Santo, New Hebrides.  The ship took on 1700 gallons fuel and on March 15 at 1208 hours was underway in company with USS PGM’s 5 & 7, for Guadalcanal, Solomon Islands. PGM-8 was O.T.C.  The ship anchored at Guadalcanal March 17, 1025 hours.  PGM-3 remained at Espiritu Santo due to engine troubles.

During the period of March 17 to 27, PGM-8 remained in the vicinity of the MTB Base at Tulagi, and Purvis Bay, Florida Islands, Solomon Islands.  At 0615 hours on March 27, the ship was underway for MTB Base 11, Rendova, New Georgia, Solomon Islands.  The ship was in company with USS PGM’s 5 and 7 pursuant to CTF 31 secret dispatch 251302 and anchored in Rendova Harbor at 1935 hours.

PGM-8 was stationed at Rendova between March 27 and April 15, 1944.  During this period, the ship participated in various exercises (anti-aircraft firing, night torpedo attack and illumination, shore bombardment, simulated barge hunting).  These exercises were conducted with the participation of PGM’s, PT boats and PBY planes.

PGM-8 departed MTB Base 11, Rendova,  at 0707 hours on April 15, underway for Treasury Islands pursuant to orders of ComMTBRons SoPac, conf dispatch #140605 of April 1944.  The ship anchored in Blanche Harbor, Treasury Islands, at 1715 hours the same day.  
Motor Torpedo Boat Base 9 at the Treasury Islands served as the home base for PGM-8 for the period 15 April 1944 to 24 February 1945.

Officers of USS PGM-8 
All officers were USNR (United States Navy Reserve)

name, rank(s) during service on board, file number, primary duty(s), dates of service on board

HESSEL, Paul Warren, Lt., 179409, Commanding Officer, 8/18/43 - 4/10/45 P. W. Hessel was a native of Brooklyn, NY, received his undergraduate degree from Cornell University in 1927 and his law degree from New York University in 1929. He was licensed to practice law in New York state.PICKERING, Robert Alexander, Lt., 103359, Executive Officer, 8/18/43 - 9/9/44

YOUNG, Thomas Harding, Jr., Lt (jg), 189505, Third Officer, Executive Officer, 8/18/43 - 10/25/44

HENDERSON, James F., Ensign, Lt (jg), 280427, Third Officer, Executive Officer, 9/14/44 - 12/23/44 
 
KRUGER, William James, Ensign, 359553, Gunnery Officer, 10/14/44 - 11/29/45   
  
STRYKER, John Reid, Ensign, Lt (jg), 341781 Engineering Officer, Executive Officer, 10/22/44 - 12/21/45
      
THOMPSON, Elmer Tipton, Lt (jg), Lt., 225181, Commanding Officer (beginning 4/10/45), 2/13/45 - 12/21/45 
 
JORDAN, Robert Arthur, Ensign, 432920, Gunnery Officer, 11/21/45 – 12/21/45

Crew of USS PGM-8 

name, highest rate held while on board, dates of service on board

Akonom, Henry James  BM2c (T) 8/18/43 – 9/29/45

Arnold, Alvin William  CEM (AA)(T) 8/18/43 - 11/13/45

Barnes, Moses  S1c  9/23/44 – 12/17/45

Bogan, John James  SM3c  9/15/45 – 11/13/45

Boni, Dan  MoMM2c  1/18/44 – 12/17/45

Bright, James Jewett  RdM3c  8/18/43 – 5/14/44

Briscoe, Harold Riveres  CBM (PA)(T)  8/18/43 – 11/13/45

Busboom, Ernest Paul F1c (MoMM) 11/26/45 – 12/20/45

Casey, James Robert S2c  11/31/45 -  12/20/45

De Baun, Sidney Burton  MoMM1c 8/18/43 – 9/21/44

Deranieau, Leo Joseph  S1c  1/3/45 – 11/12/45

Downing, Eugene  St2c  9/16/43 – 12/17/45

Durant, Randle CCS (AA) 8/18/43 – 11/17/44

Gill, Robert Paul SM1c  1/20/44 - 8/31/45

Gribble, John Bernard  RdM2c  11/19/45 – 11/27/45

Hall, John Ray  GM3c  8/18/43 –11/9/45

Hartry, Floyd Edmond  S2c  11/31/45 – 12/11/45

Holzer, Howard John  QM3c  7/18/45 – 9/26/45

Irvin, Robert Lee  SoM3c  8/18/43 – 9/20/44

Kern, Frederick George QM1c 8/18/43 – 12/10/45

Kern, Malcolm Harry  RM2c  8/18/43 – 5/16/45

Land, Purcell Martin  Cox (T)  9/16/44 – 4/9/45

Leone, John Benedict S1c (GM) 10/23/44 – 10/3/45

Liker, Peter Albert  S1c  transferred to U.S. Naval Mobile Hospital #3, Tutuila, Samoa 2/21/44

Lockrem, Theodore Magnus  RM1c (T)  8/18/43 – 12/17/45

Lowe, Don “J” S1c  1/1/44 – 11/7/44

Lysengen, Allen Tilford  CGM (AA) 8/18/43 – 11/5/45

Masl, Thomas Jr. F2c  11/1/45 – 12/20/45

Mc Cracken, Ora Fibron   MoMM3c (T)  9/10/44 – 11/1/45

Mc Ghee, John Franklin  GM2c (T) 9/23/44 –  12/17/45

Morse, Ralph Edson  RdM1c 9/17/44 – 9/26/45

Odom, Dennis Cordell  Cox  8/18/43  - 6/26/44

Quick, Herman, Jr.  MoMM1c  8/18/43   - 12/17/45 
   
Quinn, Edward Richard GM3c  (T)  10/19/45 -   12/20/45

Ragsdale, “T” “F”, Jr.  Y1c (T)  1/1/44 – 1/4/45

Rife, Harold Benson  SC1c (T)  11/17/44 – 10/22/45

Rodts, Homer Florace  MoMM3c (T)  6/2/44 – 11/1/45

Rose, Nicklas Anthony  SC3c  6/2/44 – 12/17/45

Rowe, Edward Thomas S2c (QM)  9/15/45 – 12/20/45

Roy, Lyle Dale  S2c  10/31/45 – 12/20/45

Rymek, Joseph Albert  S1c  6/2/44 – 11/1/45

Sams, Caney  S1c  6/2/44 – 11/1/45

Schwab, Francis Earl  Cox  8/18/43 – 9/11/44,  at hospital,   10/2/44 – 9/26/45

Smith, Denzil Junior  PhM2c  11/2/43 – 12/17/45

Steimer, Robert William CMoMM (AA)(T)  8/18/43 – 11/13/45

Terrill, William Devella CMoMM (AA)(T) 8/18/43 – 8/22/45

Tiliman, Vincent Elmer S1c  10/19/45 -  12/17/45

Trent, Sylvan Wilson  Cox  9/15/45 – 11/1/45

Tyson, Wilson Augustus Y2c  1/1/44 – 11/1/45

Worster, Martin Bernard  CMoMM (AA)(T)  8/18/43 – 10/15/44

Young, Neel Ray  S1c  11/1/45 – 11/13/45

References
Motor Gunboat/Patrol Gunboat Photo Archive: PGM-8
USS SC-1366 (SC-1366)
see PGM-3 for service details
Deck Logs, USS PGM-1, PGM-2, PGM-3, PGM-4, PGM-5, PGM-6, PGM-7, PGM-8 are available at the National Archives, College Park, MD  Contributor Jlafavre has photocopies of logs for all 8 ships for period 1/1/1944 to dates of decommission

Specific

PGM-1-class motor gunboats
Ships built in Los Angeles
1943 ships
World War II gunboats of the United States